The Pennsylvania Treasurer election of 2012 was held on November 6, 2012. The primary election was held on April 24, 2012.

Candidates
Incumbent Rob McCord and challenger Diana Irey Vaughan both ran unopposed in the Democratic and Republican primaries, respectively. Patricia M. Fryman was the Libertarian candidate.

Results
On November 6, 2012, McCord defeated Irey Vaughan, a Washington County Commissioner and former Congressional candidate, to be re-elected Treasurer of Pennsylvania.

References

2012 Pennsylvania elections
Pennsylvania state treasurer elections
Pennsylvania